Henry Owen was a Welsh theologian.

Henry Owen may also refer to:
Henry D. Owen (1920–2011), American diplomat
Henry Owen, character in Phobia
Henry Owen, Sheriff of Anglesey in 1652

See also
Henry Owens (disambiguation)
Harry Owen (disambiguation)